Funiculaire Ecluse - Plan is a funicular railway in Neuchâtel, Switzerland. The line leads from Ecluse at 442 m to Plan at 556 m, the neighborhood of the city on Le Plan (595 m). The funicular with two cars has a single track with a passing loop. The line of 399 m in length has a difference of elevation of 111 m. Intermediate stations are Boine (520 m) and Côte. The lower part and the passing loop are in tunnels (80 m and 86 m length originally). Built in 1890, it used water counterbalancing before electrification in 1907. The funicular is owned and operated by Transports publics Neuchâtelois.

References

External links 
TransN: Funiculaires

fr:Funiculaire Écluse – Plan
pl:Kolej linowo-terenowa Écluse – Plan
uk:Фунікулер Екліз - План

Ecluse-Plan
Transport in Neuchâtel
Metre gauge railways in Switzerland
Railway lines opened in 1890
Former water-powered funicular railways converted to electricity